Andromeda IX (And 9) is a dwarf spheroidal satellite of the Andromeda Galaxy. It was discovered in 2004 by resolved stellar photometry from the Sloan Digital Sky Survey (SDSS), by Zucker et al. (2004). At the time of its discovery, it was the galaxy with the lowest known surface brightness, ΣV ≃ 26.8mags arcsec−2 and the faintest galaxy known from its intrinsic absolute brightness.

It was found from data acquired within an SDSS scan along the major axis of M31, on October 5, 2002. Its distance was estimated to be almost exactly the same as that of M31 by McConnacrchie et al. (2005).

See also
 List of Andromeda's satellite galaxies

References

External links
SEDS webpage for Andromeda IX

Dwarf spheroidal galaxies
4689222
Local Group
Andromeda Subgroup
Andromeda (constellation)
Astronomical objects discovered in 2002